Glyn Williams may refer to:

 Glyndwr Williams (born 1932), professor of history at Queen Mary, University of London
 Glyn Williams (footballer) (1918–2011), Welsh footballer
 Glyn Williams, developer of Warhead